is a Shinto shrine adjacent to the gardens of Kairakuen in Mito, Ibaraki, Japan. Founded in 1874, enshrined are Tokugawa Mitsukuni, second daimyō of the Mito Domain and compiler of Dai Nihonshi, and Tokugawa Nariaki, ninth lord and founder of the nearby Kōdōkan han school. The Tokiwa Jinja Reisai or annual festival is held on 12 May. A cannon and a drum have been designated as Cultural Properties by the city.

See also
 Mito Domain
 Tokugawa clan
 Kōdōkan
 Tōshō-gū
 Modern system of ranked Shinto Shrines

References

External links

  
 Tokiwa Jinja – English summary  

Beppyo shrines
Shinto shrines in Ibaraki Prefecture
Mito Domain
Mito, Ibaraki